Wanghua District, is one of the four districts under the administration of the city of Fushun, Liaoning province, People's Republic of China.

Administrative divisions
There are 10 subdistricts and one town in the district.

Subdistricts:
Jianshe Subdistrict, Wulaotun Subdistrict, Guchengzi Subdistrict, Binwu Subdistrict, Putun Subdistrict, Guangming Subdistrict, Heping Subdistrict, Gongnong Subdistrict, Tiantun Subdistrict, Xinmin Subdistrict

The only town is Tayu

References

External links

Fushun
County-level divisions of Liaoning
Districts of China